Daniil Aleksandrovich Yuffa (born 25 February 1997) is a Russian-Spanish chess grandmaster.

Together with 43 other Russian chess players, Yuffa signed an open letter to Russian president Vladimir Putin, protesting against the 2022 Russian invasion of Ukraine and expressing solidarity with the  Ukrainian people.

Chess career 
Born in 1997, Yuffa earned his grandmaster title in 2016.

In September 2017, Yuffa appeared on the Russia-1 talent show "Amazing People", playing three blindfold simultaneous games while performing classical music pieces on the piano.

In February 2018, he participated in the Aeroflot Open. He finished 41 out of 92, scoring 4½/9 (+2–2=5). In March 2018, he competed in the European Individual Chess Championship. He placed thirteenth, scoring 7½/11 (+5–1=5).

In 2019, at the Chess World Cup 2019, as the 106th seed, Yuffa upset 23rd seed David Navara in the first round and then beat 42nd seed Luke McShane in the second round before losing to 10th seed Teimour Radjabov in the third round.

In 2021, Yuffa won the Roquetas de Mar Festival with a score of 7.5/9. Since October 2021 he represents the Spanish Chess Federation.

References

External links 

Living people
1997 births
Chess grandmasters
Russian chess players
People from Tyumen